Loud About Loathing is an EP by None More Black. It was released in 2004.

Track listing
 "Oh, There's Legwork" - 3:17
 "Peace on Mars, 'Cause You Ain't Gonna Get it Here" - 2:29
 "Traffic is a Global Word"- 2:14
 "Genuine Malaise and Misery" - 1:55
 "iScrapbook" - 2:53
 "I'll Buy You the Fucking Single"- 2:42

The title, "Oh, There's Legwork" comes from yet another episode of Seinfeld.

2004 albums
None More Black albums